Charulatha Mani (born 21 January 1981) is an Indian-born Australian Carnatic and playback singer. She has been performing Carnatic concerts since 1999. She has also sung for movies. Charulatha has appeared in numerous TV shows and radio programmes, in India, and overseas. She has recorded many, CD and DVD albums. Her Isai Payanam TV show, aired on Jaya TV, deals with Ragas in Carnatic and film music and has completed more than 80 episodes. She recently received her PhD from the prestigious Queensland Conservatorium Griffith University, Brisbane, Australia, on Hybridising carnatic Music and Early Opera. Charu's music is known for its impeccable adherence to the Karnatik principles. It is also known for being courageous and out there. It is this ongoing interplay, of newness and the vintage, that has become the hallmark of her unique performance philosophy and signature style. This interesting interweave derives from her strong belief that Karnatik music must embrace innovation, inclusivity and diversity in contemporary society.

Profile
Charulatha Mani is a leading Carnatic music vocalist and has a huge fan following in India and abroad. Gifted with a rich, melodious voice, and amazing creativity she has a vast repertoire of compositions of various genres, and this has made her one of the most popular and renowned artistes of today. She initially trained under her mother Smt Hemalatha Mani, Veena artiste, and later trained under vidwans Sri Sandhyavananam Srinivasa Rao, and Calcutta K. S. Krishnamurthy.  She regularly performs all over the globe, and has won several prestigious awards including the Yuva Kala Bharati from Bharat Kalachar, the Isai Kurasil from New Delhi and M S Subbulakshmi Endowment Award from Narada Gana Sabha, Chennai, Best Ragam Tanam Pallavi award from Krishna Gana Sabha. She is also an engineer by education. She holds a bachelor's degree in mechanical engineering from College of Engineering Guindy, Anna University-Chennai. She gave up a promising career in engineering to pursue her passion in music.

Her Isai Payanam programmes have made her a crowd-puller and the way she instantly connects with her audience and feels their pulse have made her Isai Payanam home videos a must in every music lover's home. In Isai Payanam she presents ragas in Classical and Film music with examples from Classical and Film genres exuding the melodic feel and the raga's innate beauty.  Her raga segment presentations for Jaya TV started off the Isai Payanam trend which she later carried over to live performances. She holds a master's degree in music from the University of  Madras.  Charulatha Mani is also a prominent Cine Playback singer with several super-hits in many south Indian languages to her credit.

Her super-hits include:
"Kaakka Kaakka" from "Naan Avan Illai"(2008)
"En Uchi Mandaila" from Vijay's Vettaikaran (Vijay Antony -2009)
"Chillax" from Vijay's Velayudham (Vijay Antony-2011)
"Theeye Theeye" from Suriya's Maattrraan (Harris Jayaraj-2012)

She also writes the column "A Raga's journey" for The Hindu newspaper which is widely read and appreciated.

Carnatic music
Charulatha Mani has performed in all major sabhas in Chennai and all over India. She has toured London, Canada, Australia, Singapore, the United States, Sri Lanka, and Europe.

She has been awarded the 'Woman Achievers Award' (2009), M.S. Subbulakshmi Endowment Award from Narada Gana Sabha (2008), Yuva Kala Bharathi from Bharat Kalachar in 2005, and Best Young Vocalist awards from Narada Gana Sabha (2003), Sri Parthasarathy Swami Sabha (2003), SAFE (2002), and Ragam Tanam Pallavi Award from Sri Krishna Gana Sabha (2002). Charulatha is the recipient of Scholarships from the Government of India and the Government of Tamil Nadu for performing and advanced learning of music.

Charulatha's music is frequently featured in radio broadcasts and television appearances. She is currently presenting Isai Cafe on Raj TV, and Isai Payanam on Jaya TV, which presents ragas in Carnatic and Film music.

Playback singing
Charulatha also pursues a career in Playback singing for films. Charulatha's film credits include Maattrraan, Velayutham, Oru Koodai Mutham, Veluthu Kattu, Vettaikkaaran, Aaravadhu vanam, Naan Avanillai, Budhivanta, Thanthiran, Kaadalan Kaadali, Nandha, and Thirumannam Ennum Nikkah and 'Thandhaay' from Nadigaiyar Thilagam.

Discography
 2018 - Thanthai in Nadigaiyar Thilagam and Sada Nannu in Mahanati, music director: Mickey J Meyer, Produced by Aswani Dutt, Priyanka Dutt and Swapna Dutt
 2013 - Thirumanam Ennum Nikkah, music director: M Ghibran, produced by Aascar Ravichandran
 2013 - Chennai Express, music director: Vishal–Shekhar, produced by Red Chillies Entertainment
 2012 - Chikki Mukki, music director: Gowtham, produced by Senthil Kumar
 2012 - Maattrraan, music director: Harris Jayaraj, produced by AGS Entertainment
 2012 - Thalattu Padalgal - Lullabies (Audio CD), Super Audio
 2011 - Velayutham, music director: Vijay Antony, produced by Aascar Films
 2011 - Ayudha Porattam, music director: Nandhan Raj, produced by Jai Balaji Movie Makers
 2011 - Pasakara Nanbargal, music director: Dhina, produced by G.M Balaji
 2011 - Suttum Vizhi Sudare, music director: Aravind Sriram, produced by Hemalatha T., New Music
 2010 - Oru Koodai Mutham, music director: Shanthan, produced by Nalla Charan Reddy, Junglee Music
 2010 - Veluthu Kattu, music director: Bharani, produced by S.A. Chandrasekaran
 2010 - Sankirtanam - Popular Telugu Kritis (Audio CD), Rhythm Audio
 2010 - Isai Payanam - Live in UK (MP3 CD), Rhythm Audio
 2009 - Vettaikkaaran, music director: Vijay Antony, produced by Sun Pictures
 2009 - Aaravadhu Vanam, music director: Haribabu, produced by Mpg Films International
 2009 - Kaadalan Kaadali, music director: Nandhan Raj, produced by Jai Balaji Moviemakers
 2009 - Thanthiran, music director: V.Thasi, produced by Vijayalakshmi Ramamoorthi
 2008 - Budhivanta, music director: Vijay Antony, produced by SV Rajendra Singh Babu
 2008 - Manodharma (Audio CD), Saregama
 2008 - Mooladhara Murthy - Tamil Kritis (DVD), Moser Baer
 2007 - Naan Avanillai, music director: Vijay Antony, produced by Japak Package Ltd.
 2007-2009 - Isai Payanam - A Musical Journey with Charulatha Mani (DVD, Volumes 1–10), Giri Trading Agency Pvt Ltd
 2006 - Hiranmayim - Songs on Devi (Audio CD), Kosmic Music
 2005 - Ganadarshini (VCD), Carnatica
 2005 - Madrasil Margazhi (Audio CD), Rajalakshmi Audio
 2004 - Nostalgia - Golden Classics of Yesteryears (VCD), Maximum Media
 2004 - Melakartha Ragas - Listen & Learn (Audio CD), Giri Trading Agency Pvt Ltd
 2004 - Bho Shambho - Songs on Lord Shiva (Audio CD), Giri Trading Agency Pvt Ltd
 2003 - Thirupaavai - Star dot Star
 2003 - Mangalyam - Marriage Songs (Audio CD), Giri Trading Agency Pvt Ltd
 2002 - Krishnam Vande Jagatgurum - Songs on Lord Krishna (Audio CD), Giri Trading Agency Pvt Ltd
 2001 - Nandha, music director: Yuvan Shankar Raja, produced by Aparajeeth Films

References

External links

 Charulatha Mani's website
 Charulatha Mani's blog

1981 births
Living people
Women Carnatic singers
Carnatic singers
Tamil singers
Singers from Chennai
Indian women classical singers
Women musicians from Tamil Nadu
21st-century Indian singers
21st-century Indian women singers
Australian people of Indian descent